D. K. Raja was an Indian politician and former Member of the Legislative Assembly of Tamil Nadu. He was elected to the Tamil Nadu legislative assembly as an  Independent candidate from Srivilliputhur constituency in 1952 election. He was one of the two winners in the constituency, the other being Indian National Congress candidate A. Vaikuntam.

References 

Tamil Nadu politicians
Members of the Tamil Nadu Legislative Assembly
Year of birth missing
Year of death missing
Indian National Congress politicians from Tamil Nadu